Shenazand (also Romanized as Shenāzand and Shanāzand; also known as Chenāzand and Chīnīzand) is a village in Ilat-e Qaqazan-e Sharqi Rural District, Kuhin District, Qazvin County, Qazvin Province, Iran. At the 2006 census, its population was 531, in 122 families.

References 

Populated places in Qazvin County